Annelunds IF is a Swedish football club located in Ljung in Herrljunga Municipality, Västra Götaland County.

Background
Since their foundation in 1924 Annelunds IF has participated mainly in the lower divisions of the Swedish football league system.  The club currently plays in Division 2 Västra Götaland which is the fourth tier of Swedish football. They play their home matches at the Mörlanda Sportcenter in Ljung.

The club is affiliated to the Västergötlands Fotbollförbund.

Season to season

Attendances

In recent seasons Annelunds IF have had the following average attendances:

External links
 Annelunds IF – Official Website

Footnotes

Västergötland
Football clubs in Västra Götaland County
Association football clubs established in 1924
1924 establishments in Sweden